Jaime Correa is the name of

 Jaime Correa (architect) (born 1957), urban planner, architect, and professor at the University of Miami
 Jaime Correa (footballer) (born 1979), Mexican footballer
 Jaime Correa (actor)